Fatal Desire is a 3-D Italian musical melodrama film directed by Carmine Gallone. The film is based on the opera Cavalleria rusticana and stars May Britt, Anthony Quinn, Ettore Manni, and Kerima. For the vocal parts Quinn was dubbed by Tito Gobbi.

The film's sets were designed by the art director Gastone Medin.

Cast

References

External links 
 

1953 films
1950s musical drama films
1950s historical musical films
Italian historical musical films
Italian musical drama films
1950s Italian-language films
Films directed by Carmine Gallone
1953 3D films
Italian black-and-white films
Films based on operas
Films based on works by Giovanni Verga
Films set in Sicily
Films set in the 19th century
Minerva Film films
1953 drama films
Italian 3D films
Melodrama films
1950s Italian films